Roșia de Amaradia is a commune in Gorj County, Oltenia, Romania. It is composed of seven villages: Becheni, Dealu Viei, Roșia de Amaradia, Ruget, Seciurile, Stejaru and Șitoaia.

References

Communes in Gorj County
Localities in Oltenia